Countess Zofia Branicka (11 January 1790– 6 January 1879) was a Polish noble woman, art collector.

She was the daughter of Franciszek Ksawery Branicki, one of the leaders of the Targowica Confederation, and Aleksandra von Engelhardt, the niece of Grigory Potemkin. In 1816, she married Artur Potocki.

Further reading
Maria Kalergi, Listy do Adama Potockiego, ed. by Halina Kenarowa, translated from French by Halina Kenarowa and Róża Drojecka, Warszawa, 1986.

1790 births
1879 deaths
Zofia
19th-century Polish nobility